Zimmern is a village and a quarter of the town of Bad Langensalza in Thuringia, central Germany.

Geography 
Zimmern is located southwest of Bad Langensalza on the Landesstraße (state's road) L 1042, which connects the village with Alterstedt in the northwest and Ufhoven in the northeast. The rest of the quarter belongs to the arable farming area near Bad Langensalza with its location on the edge of the Thuringian Basin. The village has several streams that flow into the Salza through vegetated erosion channels: The Zimmertalsgraben rises on the edge of the Hainich and joins the Orbach in the centre of the village. From here on it is called Zimmerbach. Further south, but also on the edge of the National Park, the Hellerbach rises with several of its headwaters. About  before the bridge of the Bad Langensalza bypass (Bundesstraße 247), the Zimmerbach and the Hellerbach join and a few metres further, they join the source stream of the Salza.

The neighbouring villages are: Waldstedt to the north, Ufhoven to the north-east, Grumbach to the south-east, Craula to the south-west and Alterstedt to the north-west.

History 
Zimmern was first mentioned in a document in 775 AD.

 was consecrated in 1700. Until 1815, the village belonged to the Electorate of Saxony's district of Langensalza and after its cession to Prussia, from 1816 to 1944, it was part of the district of Langensalza in the province of Saxony.

After the founding of the German Democratic Republic, agriculture in the village was forcibly collectivised. Today there is an equestrian farm in the village.

Zimmern was incorporated into Bad Langensalza on 1 January 1994. At the end of 2015, 330 inhabitants were registered in the village.

Notable people 
  (1589–1637), Lutheran theologian and rhetorician
  (1888–1965), fire engineer and fire inspector as well as SS brigade leader and police major general

References

External links 

Bad Langensalza
Former municipalities in Thuringia